Miles Bonny (born November 7, 1980) is a record producer, singer-songwriter, trumpeter, and DJ. Originally from New Jersey, Bonny began producing and creating hip hop while living in the midwest in the late 1990s, and founded the hip-hop group SoundsGood with rapper Joe Good in 2000. He has released a number of solo albums, and has collaborated with musicians such as Deep Thinkers, Ces Cru, and Sage Francis. He operates the record label InnateSounds, and in 2010 Bonny won the Pitch Music Award for DJ Hip-Hop in Kansas City. Currently based in New Mexico, Bonny frequently tours as a DJ and performer.

Early life
Miles Bonny was born on November 7, 1980 in New York City, to his parents Anne Grothe and Francis Bonny, a broadway musician. His grandmother, Helen Bonny, was a music therapist. In 1981, Bonny moved to Teaneck, New Jersey where he attended Teaneck High School.

Music career

Early years (1999-2004)
Bonny moved to Lawrence, Kansas to attend the University of Kansas in 1999. There he began producing music and started the regional hip hop website Lawrencehiphop.com, which helped bring media attention to the region's hip hop artists. He has also worked on collaborative projects with Approach (Al Japro) and iD (The Find). During this period an internship with Sub Verse Music led Miles becoming more acquainted with the New York independent hip hop scene, which informed his ability to later start his own label, INnatesounds.

Soundsgood
Additionally, he co-founded the hip-hop group SoundsGood in 2000 with Kansas City-based rapper Joe Good. In the early years of SoundsGood the group was well known in the "house party" scene. After the pair released a 12-song eponymous debut LP in 2002, they released Biscuits & Gravy in 2005. Miles released an instrumental version of Biscuits & Gravy in 2007, after Joe Good had left the hip-hop scene. In 2008, Miles released another SoundsGood LP using material recorded between the band's debut and Biscuits.

Recent years (2005-present)
Miles moved to Kansas City, Missouri in 2005. That year he produced the track "Comin For You" for rap artist Reach, which was chosen by a panel of judges including DJ Premier for Scion's NextUp competition. That same year he received international recognition in Scratch Magazine's Hydrosonic's section.

In 2006, Miles released his debut solo project, Smell Smoke? According to The Pitch, the main single from the album, "Miles Gets Open," is a "soulful, jazzy tune, on which Bonny himself plays trumpet, showcases his jazz upbringing in New Jersey, where his father, now a woodworker, used to work nights as a musician across the river in New York City."

In 2007 he produced and recorded for musicians such as Reggie B, Deep Thinkers, and John Brewer, all of whom are members of the hip-hop collective Innate Sounds. That year he also made the beat for "Call Me Francois" on Sage Francis' album Human the Death Dance, released on Epitaph Records.

He released the "Miles Gets Open" 7" & Closer Love EP in conjunction with the German-based Melting Pot Music in 2007. Miles' next work, Steveland, was released on December 15, 2007, and is a five-song album with Miles singing and playing the horns over a 2002 tribute to Stevie Wonder by indie producer Madlib.

In 2010, he won the Pitch Music Award for DJ Hip-Hop in Kansas City.

Bonny released Egg Black EP with producer B.Lewis on April 3, 2012, and he was nominated for a 2013 Amadeus Award (Austria) for his S3 project. He has performed internationally in countries such as Germany, the Czech Republic, Poland, Australia, New Zealand, and Austria.

In 2021 he released Lumberjack Soul 2. He is currently working on a duo album with wife Shhor in Taos, New Mexico.

Personal life
In 2013 Bonny moved to Tres Piedras, New Mexico. His home is solar-paneled and handbuilt using materials such as wood, straw bales, and adobe. Bonny has a separate career as a social worker.

Discography

Solo material
Studio albums
2000: Dino Jack Crispy
2003: The Find
2006: Smell Smoke
2007: Remixes Volume One
2007: Closer Love EP
2008: Clap Clap EP
2009: Steveland
2009: Scorpio Inn
2009: Lumberjack Soul / J.Birly / Breakfast
2010: INcense and Wine
2010: ACCAs
2011: Lumberjack Soul
2011: The "We" Remixes EP
2012: 2011 Bootlegs
2013: For My Real Folks EP
2013: Ain’t No Sunshine
2013: Super Yum Yums 

Singles
2006: "Miles Gets Open "
2012: "Do You / You"
2013: "Water Rights"

SoundsGood
Studio albums
2002: SoundsGood”
2005: Biscuits & Gravy”
2006: Midnight Music (Subcontact)
2006: Midnight Music EP (Subcontact)

Singles
2004: "Money / Pacin" (InnateSounds)
2012: "Goodbye"

S3
Studio albums
2012: Supa Soul Sh*t (Melting Pot Music)

Collaborations
Studio albums
2003:  Al Japro by Approach and Miles Bonny
2009: Instant Saadiq by DJ Day and Miles Bonny
2010: Doin our Thang by Reggie B and Miles Bonny
2011: Did This For Hip Hop by Ces Cru and Miles Bonny
2011: It's been a LonG day by Lindquist & Greer
2012: Understanding by Jabee + Miles Bonny “
2012: Egg Black EP  by Miles Bonny & B. Lewis

References

External links
MilesBonny.com

1980 births
Living people
American DJs
Singers from New Jersey
Singers from New York City
People from Teaneck, New Jersey
Teaneck High School alumni
American neo soul singers
American hip hop record producers
Record producers from New York (state)
21st-century American male singers
21st-century American singers